Streptomyces fukangensis is an alkaliphilic bacterium species from the genus of Streptomyces which has been isolated from desert soil from Xinjiang in China.

See also 
 List of Streptomyces species

References

Further reading

External links
Type strain of Streptomyces fukangensis at BacDive -  the Bacterial Diversity Metadatabase	

fukangensis
Bacteria described in 2014